Alina Charaeva and Maria Timofeeva were the defending champions but chose not to participate.

Mariia Tkacheva and Anastasia Zolotareva won the title, defeating Momoko Kobori and Moyuka Uchijima in the final, 4–6, 6–1, [10–4].

Seeds

Draw

Draw

References

External Links
Main Draw

President's Cup - Doubles
2022 Women's Doubles